Coprophilus striatulus is a species of spiny-legged rove beetle in the family Staphylinidae. It is found in Europe and Northern Asia (excluding China) and North America.

References

Further reading

External links

 

Oxytelinae
Articles created by Qbugbot
Beetles described in 1793